James William Beswick (born February 12, 1958) is a former Major League Baseball outfielder who appeared in 17 games for the San Diego Padres in . He was a switch hitter and threw right-handed.

Career
Beswick was drafted by the San Diego Padres in the 5th round of the 1976 amateur draft and played that season for the Class A short-season Walla Walla Padres. He spent 1977 playing for the Class A Reno Silver Sox and most of 1978 with the Double-A Amarillo Gold Sox.

In August 1978, Beswick was called up to the major league club. He appeared in 17 games for the Padres, primarily as a pinch hitter and pinch runner. He was sent back to the minors following the season, and spent 1979–1981 playing for the Triple-A Hawaii Islanders.

In 1982 he signed with the California Angels organization and played for the Double-A Holyoke Millers and Nashua Angels. His American professional baseball career ended after the 1983 season at the age of 25.

External links

Jim Beswick minor league statistics at Baseball-Reference

1958 births
Living people
Amarillo Gold Sox players
Baseball players from Pennsylvania
Hawaii Islanders players
Holyoke Millers players
Major League Baseball outfielders
Nashua Angels players
People from Wilkinsburg, Pennsylvania
Reno Silver Sox players
San Diego Padres players
Walla Walla Padres players